Bangalaia fisheri is a species of beetle in the family Cerambycidae. It was described by Stephan von Breuning in 1936. It is known from Gabon, the Ivory Coast, and Equatorial Guinea.

References

Prosopocerini
Beetles described in 1936